Black Heart is a 1983 novel by Eric Van Lustbader, which makes some reference to the 1960s rise of the Khmer Rouge.

References

1983 American novels
American thriller novels
Novels by Eric Van Lustbader